The origin of speech refers to the general problem of the origin of language in the context of the physiological development of the human speech organs such as the tongue, lips, and vocal organs used to produce phonological units in all spoken languages. The origin of speech has been studied through many fields and topics such as: evolution, anatomy, and history of linguistics. The origin of speech is related to the more general problem of the origin of language, the evolution of distinctively human speech capacities has become a distinct and in many ways separate area of scientific research. The topic is a separate one because language is not necessarily spoken: it can equally be written or signed. Speech is in this sense optional, although it is the default modality for language.

Background 

There are many different theories and ideas that give us a theoretical framework of how speech in humans originated. Multiple of these theories play on the idea of how humans evolved over time.

Monkeys, apes and humans, like many other animals, have evolved specialized mechanisms for producing sound for purposes of social communication. On the other hand, no monkey or ape uses its tongue for such purposes. The human species' unprecedented use of the tongue, lips and other moveable parts seems to place speech in a quite separate category, making its evolutionary emergence an intriguing theoretical challenge in the eyes of many scholars.

Nevertheless, recent insights in human evolution – more specifically, human Pleistocene littoral evolution – help understand how human speech evolved: different biological pre-adaptations to spoken language find their origin in humanity's waterside past, such as a larger brain (thanks to DHA and other brain-specific nutrients in seafoods), voluntary breathing (breath-hold diving for shellfish, etc.), and suction feeding of soft-slippery seafoods. Suction feeding explains why humans, as opposed to other hominoids, evolved hyoidal descent (tongue-bone descended in the throat), closed tooth-rows (with incisiform canine teeth) and a globular tongue perfectly fitting in a vaulted and smooth palate (without transverse ridges as in apes): all this allowed the pronunciation of consonants. Other, probably older, pre-adaptations to human speech are territorial songs and gibbon-like duetting and vocal learning.

Vocal learning, the ability to imitate sounds – as in many birds and bats and a number of Cetacea and Pinnipedia – is arguably required for locating or finding back (amid the foliage or in the sea) the offspring or parents. Indeed, independent lines of evidence (comparative, fossil, archeological, paleo-environmental, isotopic, nutritional, and physiological) show that early-Pleistocene "archaic" Homo spread intercontinentally along the Indian Ocean shores (they even reached overseas islands such as Flores) where they regularly dived for littoral foods such as shell- and crayfish, which are extremely rich in brain-specific nutrients, explaining Homo's brain enlargement. Shallow diving for seafoods requires voluntary airway control, a prerequisite for spoken language. Seafood such as shellfish generally does not require biting and chewing, but stone tool use and suction feeding. This finer control of the oral apparatus was arguably another biological pre-adaptation to human speech, especially for the production of consonants.

Modality-independence

The term modality means the chosen representational format for encoding and transmitting information. A striking feature of language is that it is modality-independent. Should an impaired child be prevented from hearing or producing sound, its innate capacity to master a language may equally find expression in signing. Sign languages of the deaf are independently invented and have all the major properties of spoken language except for the modality of transmission. From this it appears that the language centres of the human brain must have evolved to function optimally, irrespective of the selected modality.

Animal communication systems routinely combine visible with audible properties and effects, but none is modality-independent. For example, no vocally-impaired whale, dolphin, or songbird could express its song repertoire equally in visual display. Indeed, in the case of animal communication, message and modality are not capable of being disentangled. Whatever message is being conveyed stems from the intrinsic properties of the signal.

Modality independence should not be confused with the ordinary phenomenon of multimodality. Monkeys and apes rely on a repertoire of species-specific "gesture-calls" – emotionally-expressive vocalisations inseparable from the visual displays which accompany them. Humans also have species-specific gesture-calls – laughs, cries, sobs, etc. – together with involuntary gestures accompanying speech. Many animal displays are polymodal in that each appears designed to exploit multiple channels simultaneously.

The human linguistic property of modality independence is conceptually distinct from polymodality. It allows the speaker to encode the informational content of a message in a single channel whilst switching between channels as necessary. Modern city-dwellers switch effortlessly between the spoken word and writing in its various forms – handwriting, typing, email, etc. Whichever modality is chosen, it can reliably transmit the full message content without external assistance of any kind. When talking on the telephone, for example, any accompanying facial or manual gestures, however natural to the speaker, are not strictly necessary. When typing or manually signing, conversely, there is no need to add sounds. In many Australian Aboriginal cultures, a section of the population – perhaps women observing a ritual taboo – traditionally restrict themselves for extended periods to a silent (manually-signed) version of their language. Then, when released from the taboo, these same individuals resume narrating stories by the fireside or in the dark, switching to pure sound without sacrifice of informational content.

Evolution of the speech organs

Speaking is the default modality for language in all cultures. Humans' first recourse is to encode our thoughts in sound – a method which depends on sophisticated capacities for controlling the lips, tongue and other components of the vocal apparatus.

The speech organs evolved in the first instance not for speech but for more basic bodily functions such as feeding and breathing. Nonhuman primates have broadly similar organs, but with different neural controls. Non-human apes use their highly-flexible, maneuverable tongues for eating but not for vocalizing. When an ape is not eating, fine motor control over its tongue is deactivated. Either it is performing gymnastics with its tongue or it is vocalising; it cannot perform both activities simultaneously. Since this applies to mammals in general, Homo sapiens are exceptional in harnessing mechanisms designed for respiration and ingestion for the radically different requirements of articulate speech.

Tongue

The word "language" derives from the Latin lingua, "tongue". Phoneticians agree that the tongue is the most important speech articulator, followed by the lips. A natural language can be viewed as a particular way of using the tongue to express thought.

The human tongue has an unusual shape. In most mammals, it is a long, flat structure contained largely within the mouth. It is attached at the rear to the hyoid bone, situated below the oral level in the pharynx. In humans, the tongue has an almost circular sagittal (midline) contour, much of it lying vertically down an extended pharynx, where it is attached to a hyoid bone in a lowered position. Partly as a result of this, the horizontal (inside-the-mouth) and vertical (down-the-throat) tubes forming the supralaryngeal vocal tract (SVT) are almost equal in length (whereas in other species, the vertical section is shorter). As we move our jaws up and down, the tongue can vary the cross-sectional area of each tube independently by about 10:1, altering formant frequencies accordingly. That the tubes are joined at a right angle permits pronunciation of the vowels [i], [u] and [a], which nonhuman primates cannot do. Even when not performed particularly accurately, in humans the articulatory gymnastics needed to distinguish these vowels yield consistent, distinctive acoustic results, illustrating the quantal nature of human speech sounds. It may not be coincidental that [i], [u] and [a] are the most common vowels in the world's languages. Human tongues are a lot shorter and thinner than other mammals and are composed of a large number of muscles, which helps shape a variety of sounds within the oral cavity. The diversity of sound production is also increased with the human’s ability to open and close the airway, allowing varying amounts of air to exit through the nose. The fine motor movements associated with the tongue and the airway, make humans more capable of producing a wide range of intricate shapes in order to produce sounds at different rates and intensities.

Lips
In humans, the lips are important for the production of stops and fricatives, in addition to vowels. Nothing, however, suggests that the lips evolved for those reasons. During primate evolution, a shift from nocturnal to diurnal activity in tarsiers, monkeys and apes (the haplorhines) brought with it an increased reliance on vision at the expense of olfaction. As a result, the snout became reduced and the rhinarium or "wet nose" was lost. The muscles of the face and lips consequently became less constrained, enabling their co-option to serve purposes of facial expression. The lips also became thicker, and the oral cavity hidden behind became smaller. Hence, according to Ann MacLarnon, "the evolution of mobile, muscular lips, so important to human speech, was the exaptive result of the evolution of diurnality and visual communication in the common ancestor of haplorhines". It is unclear whether human lips have undergone a more recent adaptation to the specific requirements of speech.

Respiratory control
Compared with nonhuman primates, humans have significantly enhanced control of breathing, enabling exhalations to be extended and inhalations shortened as we speak. Whilst we are speaking, intercostal and interior abdominal muscles are recruited to expand the thorax and draw air into the lungs, and subsequently to control the release of air as the lungs deflate. The muscles concerned are markedly more innervated in humans than in nonhuman primates. Evidence from fossil hominins suggests that the necessary enlargement of the vertebral canal, and therefore spinal cord dimensions, may not have occurred in Australopithecus or Homo erectus but was present in the Neanderthals and early modern humans.

Larynx

The larynx or voice box is an organ in the neck housing the vocal folds, which are responsible for phonation. In humans, the larynx is descended, it is positioned lower than in other primates. This is because the evolution of humans to an upright position shifted the head directly above the spinal cord, forcing everything else downward. The repositioning of the larynx resulted in a longer cavity called the pharynx, which is responsible for increasing the range and clarity of the sound being produced. Other primates have almost no pharynx; therefore, their vocal power is significantly lower. Humans are not unique in this respect: goats, dogs, pigs and tamarins lower the larynx temporarily, to emit loud calls. Several deer species have a permanently lowered larynx, which may be lowered still further by males during their roaring displays. Lions, jaguars, cheetahs and domestic cats also do this. However, laryngeal descent in nonhumans (according to Philip Lieberman) is not accompanied by descent of the hyoid; hence the tongue remains horizontal in the oral cavity, preventing it from acting as a pharyngeal articulator.

Despite all this, scholars remain divided as to how "special" the human vocal tract really is. It has been shown that the larynx does descend to some extent during development in chimpanzees, followed by hyoidal descent. As against this, Philip Lieberman points out that only humans have evolved permanent and substantial laryngeal descent in association with hyoidal descent, resulting in a curved tongue and two-tube vocal tract with 1:1 proportions. Uniquely in the human case, simple contact between the epiglottis and velum is no longer possible, disrupting the normal mammalian separation of the respiratory and digestive tracts during swallowing. Since this entails substantial costs – increasing the risk of choking whilst swallowing food – we are forced to ask what benefits might have outweighed those costs. Some claim the clear benefit must have been speech, but other contest this. One objection is that humans are in fact not seriously at risk of choking on food: medical statistics indicate that accidents of this kind are extremely rare. Another objection is that in the view of most scholars, speech as we know it emerged relatively late in human evolution, roughly contemporaneously with the emergence of Homo sapiens. A development as complex as the reconfiguration of the human vocal tract would have required much more time, implying an early date of origin. This discrepancy in timescales undermines the idea that human vocal flexibility was initially driven by selection pressures for speech.

At least one orangutan has demonstrated the ability to control the voice box.

The size exaggeration hypothesis 
To lower the larynx is to increase the length of the vocal tract, in turn lowering formant frequencies so that the voice sounds "deeper" – giving an impression of greater size. John Ohala argued that the function of the lowered larynx in humans, especially males, is probably to enhance threat displays rather than speech itself. Ohala pointed out that if the lowered larynx were an adaptation for speech, we would expect adult human males to be better adapted in this respect than adult females, whose larynx is considerably less low. In fact, females invariably outperform males in verbal tests, falsifying this whole line of reasoning. William Tecumseh Fitch likewise argues that this was the original selective advantage of laryngeal lowering in our species. Although, according to Fitch, the initial lowering of the larynx in humans had nothing to do with speech, the increased range of possible formant patterns was subsequently co-opted for speech. Size exaggeration remains the sole function of the extreme laryngeal descent observed in male deer. Consistent with the size exaggeration hypothesis, a second descent of the larynx occurs at puberty in humans, although only in males. In response to the objection that the larynx is descended in human females, Fitch suggests that mothers vocalising to protect their infants would also have benefited from this ability.

Neanderthal speech

Most specialists credit the Neanderthals with speech abilities not radically different from those of modern Homo sapiens. An indirect line of argument is that their toolmaking and hunting tactics would have been difficult to learn or execute without some kind of speech. A recent extraction of DNA from Neanderthal bones indicates that Neanderthals had the same version of the FOXP2 gene as modern humans. This gene, mistakenly described as the "grammar gene", plays a role in controlling the orofacial movements which (in modern humans) are involved in speech.

During the 1970s, it was widely believed that the Neanderthals lacked modern speech capacities. It was claimed that they possessed a hyoid bone so high up in the vocal tract as to preclude the possibility of producing certain vowel sounds.

The hyoid bone is present in many mammals. It allows a wide range of tongue, pharyngeal and laryngeal movements by bracing these structures alongside each other in order to produce variation. It is now realised that its lowered position is not unique to Homo sapiens, whilst its relevance to vocal flexibility may have been overstated: although men have a lower larynx, they do not produce a wider range of sounds than women or two-year-old babies. There is no evidence that the larynx position of the Neanderthals impeded the range of vowel sounds they could produce. The discovery of a modern-looking hyoid bone of a Neanderthal man in the Kebara Cave in Israel led its discoverers to argue that the Neanderthals had a descended larynx, and thus human-like speech capabilities. However, other researchers have claimed that the morphology of the hyoid is not indicative of the larynx's position. It is necessary to take into consideration the skull base, the mandible, the cervical vertebrae and a cranial reference plane.

The morphology of the outer and middle ear of Middle Pleistocene hominins from Atapuerca, Spain, believed to be proto-Neanderthal, suggests they had an auditory sensitivity similar to modern humans and very different from chimpanzees. They were probably able to differentiate between many different speech sounds.

Hypoglossal canal

The hypoglossal nerve plays an important role in controlling movements of the tongue. In 1998, a research team used the size of the hypoglossal canal in the base of fossil skulls in an attempt to estimate the relative number of nerve fibres, claiming on this basis that Middle Pleistocene hominins and Neanderthals had more fine-tuned tongue control than either Australopithecines or apes. Subsequently, however, it was demonstrated that hypoglossal canal size and nerve sizes are not correlated, and it is now accepted that such evidence is uninformative about the timing of human speech evolution.

Distinctive features theory

According to one influential school, the human vocal apparatus is intrinsically digital on the model of a keyboard or digital computer (see below). Nothing about a chimpanzee's vocal apparatus suggests a digital keyboard, notwithstanding the anatomical and physiological similarities. This poses the question as to when and how, during the course of human evolution, the transition from analog to digital structure and function occurred.

The human supralaryngeal tract is said to be digital in the sense that it is an arrangement of moveable toggles or switches, each of which, at any one time, must be in one state or another. The vocal cords, for example, are either vibrating (producing a sound) or not vibrating (in silent mode). By virtue of simple physics, the corresponding distinctive feature – in this case, "voicing" – cannot be somewhere in between. The options are limited to "off" and "on". Equally digital is the feature known as "nasalisation". At any given moment the soft palate or velum either allows or does not allow sound to resonate in the nasal chamber. In the case of lip and tongue positions, more than two digital states may be allowed.

The theory that speech sounds are composite entities constituted by complexes of binary phonetic features was first advanced in 1938 by the Russian linguist Roman Jakobson. A prominent early supporter of this approach was Noam Chomsky, who went on to extend it from phonology to language more generally, in particular to the study of syntax and semantics. In his 1965 book, Aspects of the Theory of Syntax, Chomsky treated semantic concepts as combinations of binary-digital atomic elements explicitly on the model of distinctive features theory. The lexical item "bachelor", on this basis, would be expressed as [+ Human], [+ Male], [- Married].

Supporters of this approach view the vowels and consonants recognised by speakers of a particular language or dialect at a particular time as cultural entities of little scientific interest. From a natural science standpoint, the units which matter are those common to Homo sapiens by virtue of our biological nature. By combining the atomic elements or "features" with which all humans are innately equipped, anyone may in principle generate the entire range of vowels and consonants to be found in any of the world's languages, whether past, present or future. The distinctive features are in this sense atomic components of a universal language.

Criticism
In recent years, the notion of an innate "universal grammar" underlying phonological variation has been called into question. The most comprehensive monograph ever written about speech sounds, The Sounds of the World's Languages, by Peter Ladefoged and Ian Maddieson, found virtually no basis for the postulation of some small number of fixed, discrete, universal phonetic features. Examining 305 languages, for example, they encountered vowels that were positioned basically everywhere along the articulatory and acoustic continuum. Ladefoged concluded that phonological features are not determined by human nature: "Phonological features are best regarded as artifacts that linguists have devised in order to describe linguistic systems".

Self-organisation theory

Self-organisation characterises systems where macroscopic structures are spontaneously formed out of local interactions between the many components of the system. In self-organised systems, global organisational properties are not to be found at the local level. In colloquial terms, self-organisation is roughly captured by the idea of "bottom-up" (as opposed to "top-down") organisation. Examples of self-organised systems range from ice crystals to galaxy spirals in the inorganic world.

According to many phoneticians, the sounds of language arrange and re-arrange themselves through self-organisation. Speech sounds have both perceptual (how one hears them) and articulatory (how one produces them) properties, all with continuous values. Speakers tend to minimise effort, favouring ease of articulation over clarity. Listeners do the opposite, favouring sounds that are easy to distinguish even if difficult to pronounce. Since speakers and listeners are constantly switching roles, the syllable systems actually found in the world's languages turn out to be a compromise between acoustic distinctiveness on the one hand, and articulatory ease on the other.

Agent-based computer models take the perspective of self-organisation at the level of the speech community or population. The two main paradigms are (1) the iterated learning model and (2) the language game model. Iterated learning focuses on transmission from generation to generation, typically with just one agent in each generation. In the language game model, a whole population of agents simultaneously produce, perceive and learn language, inventing novel forms when the need arises.

Several models have shown how relatively simple peer-to-peer vocal interactions, such as imitation, can spontaneously self-organise a system of sounds shared by the whole population, and different in different populations. For example, models elaborated by Berrah et al. (1996) and de Boer (2000), and recently reformulated using Bayesian theory, showed how a group of individuals playing imitation games can self-organise repertoires of vowel sounds which share substantial properties with human vowel systems. For example, in de Boer's model, initially vowels are generated randomly, but agents learn from each other as they interact repeatedly over time. Agent A chooses a vowel from her repertoire and produces it, inevitably with some noise. Agent B hears this vowel and chooses the closest equivalent from her own repertoire. To check whether this truly matches the original, B produces the vowel she thinks she has heard, whereupon A refers once again to her own repertoire to find the closest equivalent. If this matches the one she initially selected, the game is successful, otherwise, it has failed. "Through repeated interactions", according to de Boer, "vowel systems emerge that are very much like the ones found in human languages".

In a different model, the phonetician Björn Lindblom was able to predict, on self-organisational grounds, the favoured choices of vowel systems ranging from three to nine vowels on the basis of a principle of optimal perceptual differentiation.

Further models studied the role of self-organisation in the origins of phonemic coding and combinatoriality, which is the existence of phonemes and their systematic reuse to build structured syllables. Pierre-Yves Oudeyer developed models which showed that basic neural equipment for adaptive holistic vocal imitation, coupling directly motor and perceptual representations in the brain, can generate spontaneously shared combinatorial systems of vocalisations, including phonotactic patterns, in a society of babbling individuals. These models also characterised how morphological and physiological innate constraints can interact with these self-organised mechanisms to account for both the formation of statistical regularities and diversity in vocalisation systems.

Gestural theory
The gestural theory states that speech was a relatively late development, evolving by degrees from a system that was originally gestural. Our ancestors were unable to control their vocalisation at the time when gestures were used to communicate; however, as they slowly began to control their vocalisations, spoken language began to evolve.

Three types of evidence support this theory:
 Gestural language and vocal language depend on similar neural systems. The regions on the cortex that are responsible for mouth and hand movements border each other.
 Nonhuman primates minimise vocal signals in favour of manual, facial and other visible gestures in order to express simple concepts and communicative intentions in the wild. Some of these gestures resemble those of humans, such as the "begging posture", with the hands stretched out, which humans share with chimpanzees.
Mirror Neurons

Research has found strong support for the idea that spoken language and signing depend on similar neural structures. Patients who used sign language, and who suffered from a left-hemisphere lesion, showed the same disorders with their sign language as vocal patients did with their oral language. Other researchers found that the same left-hemisphere brain regions were active during sign language as during the use of vocal or written language.

Humans spontaneously use hand and facial gestures when formulating ideas to be conveyed in speech. There are also, of course, many sign languages in existence, commonly associated with deaf communities; as noted above, these are equal in complexity, sophistication, and expressive power, to any oral language. The main difference is that the "phonemes" are produced on the outside of the body, articulated with hands, body, and facial expression, rather than inside the body articulated with tongue, teeth, lips, and breathing.

Many psychologists and scientists have looked into the mirror system in the brain to answer this theory as well as other behavioural theories. Evidence to support mirror neurons as a factor in the evolution of speech includes mirror neurons in primates, the success of teaching apes to communicate gesturally, and pointing/gesturing to teach young children language. Fogassi and Ferrari (2014) monitored motor cortex activity in monkeys, specifically area F5 in the Broca’s area, where mirror neurons are located. They observed changes in electrical activity in this area when the monkey executed or observed different hand actions performed by someone else. Broca’s area is a region in the frontal lobe responsible for language production and processing. The discovery of mirror neurons in this region, which fire when an action is done or observed specifically with the hand, strongly supports the belief that communication was once accomplished with gestures. The same is true when teaching young children language. When one points at a specific object or location, mirror neurons in the child fire as though they were doing the action, which results in long-term learning

Criticism

Critics note that for mammals in general, sound turns out to be the best medium in which to encode information for transmission over distances at speed. Given the probability that this applied also to early humans, it is hard to see why they should have abandoned this efficient method in favour of more costly and cumbersome systems of visual gesturing – only to return to sound at a later stage.

By way of explanation, it has been proposed that at a relatively late stage in human evolution, our ancestors' hands became so much in demand for making and using tools that the competing demands of manual gesturing became a hindrance. The transition to spoken language is said to have occurred only at that point. Since humans throughout evolution have been making and using tools, however, most scholars remain unconvinced by this argument. (For a different approach to this issue – one setting out from considerations of signal reliability and trust – see "from pantomime to speech" below).

Timeline of speech evolution

Little is known about the timing of language's emergence in the human species. Unlike writing, speech leaves no material trace, making it archaeologically invisible. Lacking direct linguistic evidence, specialists in human origins have resorted to the study of anatomical features and genes arguably associated with speech production. Whilst such studies may provide information as to whether pre-modern Homo species had speech capacities, it is still unknown whether they actually spoke. Whilst they may have communicated vocally, the anatomical and genetic data lack the resolution necessary to differentiate proto-language from speech.

Using statistical methods to estimate the time required to achieve the current spread and diversity in modern languages today, Johanna Nichols – a linguist at the University of California, Berkeley – argued in 1998 that vocal languages must have begun diversifying in our species at least 100,000 years ago.

More recently – in 2012 – anthropologists Charles Perreault and Sarah Mathew used phonemic diversity to suggest a date consistent with this. "Phonemic diversity" denotes the number of perceptually distinct units of sound – consonants, vowels and tones – in a language. The current worldwide pattern of phonemic diversity potentially contains the statistical signal of the expansion of modern Homo sapiens out of Africa, beginning around 60-70 thousand years ago. Some scholars argue that phonemic diversity evolves slowly and can be used as a clock to calculate how long the oldest African languages would have to have been around in order to accumulate the number of phonemes they possess today. As human populations left Africa and expanded into the rest of the world, they underwent a series of bottlenecks – points at which only a very small population survived to colonise a new continent or region. Allegedly such a population crash led to a corresponding reduction in genetic, phenotypic and phonemic diversity. African languages today have some of the largest phonemic inventories in the world, whilst the smallest inventories are found in South America and Oceania, some of the last regions of the globe to be colonised. For example, Rotokas, a language of New Guinea, and Pirahã, spoken in South America, both have just 11 phonemes, whilst !Xun, a language spoken in Southern Africa has 141 phonemes.
The authors use a natural experiment – the colonization of mainland Southeast Asia on the one hand, the long-isolated Andaman Islands on the other – to estimate the rate at which phonemic diversity increases through time. Using this rate, they estimate that the world's languages date back to the Middle Stone Age in Africa, sometime between 350 thousand and 150 thousand years ago. This corresponds to the speciation event which gave rise to Homo sapiens.

These and similar studies have however been criticised by linguists who argue that they are based on a flawed analogy between genes and phonemes, since phonemes are frequently transferred laterally between languages unlike genes, and on a flawed sampling of the world's languages, since both Oceania and the Americas also contain languages with very high numbers of phonemes, and Africa contains languages with very few. They argue that the actual distribution of phonemic diversity in the world reflects recent language contact and not deep language history - since it is well demonstrated that languages can lose or gain many phonemes over very short periods. In other words, there is no valid linguistic reason to expect genetic founder effects to influence phonemic diversity.

Speculative scenarios

Early speculations
In 1861, historical linguist Max Müller published a list of speculative theories concerning the origins of spoken language: These theories have been grouped under the category named invention hypotheses. These hypotheses were all meant to understand how the first language could have developed and postulate that human mimicry of natural sounds were how the first words with meaning were derived.

 Bow-wow. The bow-wow or cuckoo theory, which Müller attributed to the German philosopher Johann Gottfried Herder, saw early words as imitations of the cries of beasts and birds. This theory, believed to be derived from onomatopoeia, relates the meaning of the sound to the actual sound formulated by the speaker.
 Pooh-pooh. The Pooh-Pooh theory saw the first words as emotional interjections and exclamations triggered by pain, pleasure, surprise and so on. These sounds were all produced on sudden intakes of breath, which is unlike any other language. Unlike emotional reactions, spoken language is produced on the exhale, so the sounds contained in this form of communication are unlike those used in normal speech production, which makes this theory a less plausible one for language acquisition.
 Ding-dong. Müller suggested what he called the Ding-Dong theory, which states that all things have a vibrating natural resonance, echoed somehow by man in his earliest words. Words are derived from the sound associated with their meaning; for example, “crash became a word for thunder, boom for explosion.” This theory also heavily relies on the concept of onomatopoeia.
 Yo-he-ho. The yo-he-ho theory saw language emerging out of collective rhythmic labor, the attempt to synchronize muscular effort resulting in sounds such as heave alternating with sounds such as ho. Believed to be derived from the basis of human collaborative efforts, this theory states that humans needed words, which might have started off as chanting, to communicate. This need could have been to ward off predators, or served as a unifying battle cry.
 Ta-ta. This did not feature in Max Müller's list, having been proposed in 1930 by Sir Richard Paget. According to the ta-ta theory, humans made the earliest words by tongue movements that mimicked manual gestures, rendering them audible.

A common concept of onomatopoeia as the first source of words is present; however, there is a problem with this theory. Onomatopoeia can explain the first couple of words all derived from natural phenomenon, but there is no explanation as to how more complex words without a natural counterpart came to be. Most scholars today consider all such theories not so much wrong – they occasionally offer peripheral insights – as drastically limited. These theories are too narrowly mechanistic to comprehensively explain the origin of language. They assume that once the ancestors of humans had stumbled upon the appropriate ingenious mechanism for linking sounds with meanings, language automatically evolved and changed.

Problems of reliability and deception
From the perspective of modern science, the main obstacle to the evolution of speech-like communication in nature is not a mechanistic one. Rather, it is that symbols – arbitrary associations of sounds with corresponding meanings – are unreliable and may well be false. As the saying goes, "words are cheap". The problem of reliability was not recognised at all by Darwin, Müller or the other early evolutionist theorists.

Animal vocal signals are for the most part intrinsically reliable. When a cat purrs, the signal constitutes direct evidence of the animal's contented state. One can "trust" the signal not because the cat is inclined to be honest, but because it just can't fake that sound. Primate vocal calls may be slightly more manipulable, but they remain reliable for the same reason – because they are hard to fake. Primate social intelligence is Machiavellian – self-serving and unconstrained by moral scruples. Monkeys and apes often attempt to deceive one another, whilst at the same time remaining constantly on guard against falling victim to deception themselves. Paradoxically, it is precisely primates' resistance to deception that blocks the evolution of their vocal communication systems along language-like lines. Language is ruled out because the best way to guard against being deceived is to ignore all signals except those that are instantly verifiable. Words automatically fail this test.

Words are easy to fake. Should they turn out to be lies, listeners will adapt by ignoring them in favour of hard-to-fake indices or cues. For language to work, then, listeners must be confident that those with whom they are on speaking terms are generally likely to be honest. A peculiar feature of language is "displaced reference", which means reference to topics outside the currently perceptible situation. This property prevents utterances from being corroborated in the immediate "here" and "now". For this reason, language presupposes relatively high levels of mutual trust in order to become established over time as an evolutionarily stable strategy. A theory of the origins of language must, therefore, explain why humans could begin trusting cheap signals in ways that other animals apparently cannot (see signalling theory).

"Kin selection" 
The "mother tongues" hypothesis was proposed in 2004 as a possible solution to this problem. W. Tecumseh Fitch suggested that the Darwinian principle of "kin selection" – the convergence of genetic interests between relatives – might be part of the answer. Fitch suggests that spoken languages were originally "mother tongues". If speech evolved initially for communication between mothers and their own biological offspring, extending later to include adult relatives as well, the interests of speakers and listeners would have tended to coincide. Fitch argues that shared genetic interests would have led to sufficient trust and cooperation for intrinsically unreliable vocal signals – spoken words – to become accepted as trustworthy and so begin evolving for the first time.

Criticism
Critics of this theory point out that kin selection is not unique to humans. Ape mothers also share genes with their offspring, as do all animals, so why is it only humans who speak? Furthermore, it is difficult to believe that early humans restricted linguistic communication to genetic kin: the incest taboo must have forced men and women to interact and communicate with non-kin. The extension of the posited "mother tongue" networks from relatives to non-relatives remains unexplained.

"Reciprocal altruism" 
Ib Ulbæk invokes another standard Darwinian principle – "reciprocal altruism" – to explain the unusually high levels of intentional honesty necessary for language to evolve. 'Reciprocal altruism' can be expressed as the principle that if you scratch my back, I'll scratch yours. In linguistic terms, it would mean that if you speak truthfully to me, I'll speak truthfully to you. Ordinary Darwinian reciprocal altruism, Ulbæk points out, is a relationship established between frequently interacting individuals. For language to prevail across an entire community, however, the necessary reciprocity would have needed to be enforced universally instead of being left to individual choice. Ulbæk concludes that for language to evolve, early society as a whole must have been subject to moral regulation.

Criticism
Critics point out that this theory fails to explain when, how, why or by whom "obligatory reciprocal altruism" could possibly have been enforced. Various proposals have been offered to remedy this defect. A further criticism is that language doesn't work on the basis of reciprocal altruism anyway. Humans in conversational groups don't withhold information to all except listeners likely to offer valuable information in return. On the contrary, they seem to want to advertise to the world their access to socially relevant information, broadcasting it to anyone who will listen without thought of return.

"Gossip and grooming" 
Gossip, according to Robin Dunbar, does for group-living humans what manual grooming does for other primates – it allows individuals to service their relationships and so maintain their alliances. As humans began living in larger and larger social groups, the task of manually grooming all one's friends and acquaintances became so time-consuming as to be unaffordable. In response to this problem, humans invented "a cheap and ultra-efficient form of grooming" – vocal grooming.  To keep your allies happy, you now needed only to "groom" them with low-cost vocal sounds, servicing multiple allies simultaneously whilst keeping both hands free for other tasks. Vocal grooming (the production of pleasing sounds lacking syntax or combinatorial semantics) then evolved somehow into syntactical speech.

Criticism
Critics of this theory point out that the very efficiency of "vocal grooming" – that words are so cheap – would have undermined its capacity to signal commitment of the kind conveyed by time-consuming and costly manual grooming. A further criticism is that the theory does nothing to explain the crucial transition from vocal grooming – the production of pleasing but meaningless sounds – to the cognitive complexities of syntactical speech.

From pantomime to speech
According to another school of thought, language evolved from mimesis – the "acting out" of scenarios using vocal and gestural pantomime. Charles Darwin, who himself was skeptical, hypothesised that human speech and language is derived from gestures and mouth pantomime. This theory, further elaborated on by various authors, postulates that the genus Homo, different from our ape ancestors, evolved a new type of cognition. Apes are capable of associational learning. They can tie a sensory cue to a motor response often trained through classical conditioning. However, in apes,  the conditioned sensory cue is necessary for a conditioned response to be observed again. The motor response will not occur without an external cue from an outside agent. A remarkable ability that humans possess is the ability to voluntarily retrieve memories without the need for a cue (e.g. conditioned stimulus). This is not an ability that has been observed in animals except language-trained apes. There is still much controversy on whether pantomime is a capability for apes, both wild and captured. For as long as utterances needed to be emotionally expressive and convincing, it was not possible to complete the transition to purely conventional signs. On this assumption, pre-linguistic gestures and vocalisations would have been required not just to disambiguate intended meanings, but also to inspire confidence in their intrinsic reliability. If contractual commitments were necessary in order to inspire community-wide trust in communicative intentions, it would follow that these had to be in place before humans could shift at last to an ultra-efficient, high-speed – digital as opposed to analog – signalling format. Vocal distinctive features (sound contrasts) are ideal for this purpose. It is therefore suggested that the establishment of contractual understandings enabled the decisive transition from mimetic gesture to fully conventionalised, digitally encoded speech.

"Ritual/speech coevolution" 
The ritual/speech coevolution theory was originally proposed by the distinguished social anthropologist Roy Rappaport before being elaborated by anthropologists such as Chris Knight, Jerome Lewis, Nick Enfield, Camilla Power and Ian Watts. Cognitive scientist and robotics engineer Luc Steels is another prominent supporter of this general approach, as is biological anthropologist/neuroscientist Terrence Deacon.

These scholars argue that there can be no such thing as a "theory of the origins of language". This is because language is not a separate adaptation but an internal aspect of something much wider – namely, human symbolic culture as a whole. Attempts to explain language independently of this wider context have spectacularly failed, say these scientists, because they are addressing a problem with no solution. Can we imagine a historian attempting to explain the emergence of credit cards independently of the wider system of which they are a part? Using a credit card makes sense only if you have a bank account institutionally recognised within a certain kind of advanced capitalist society – one where communications technology has already been invented and fraud can be detected and prevented. In much the same way, language would not work outside a specific array of social mechanisms and institutions. For example, it would not work for an ape communicating with other apes in the wild. Not even the cleverest ape could make language work under such conditions.

 Advocates of this school of thought point out that words are cheap. As digital hallucinations, they are intrinsically unreliable. Should an especially clever ape, or even a group of articulate apes, try to use words in the wild, they would carry no conviction. The primate vocalizations that do carry conviction – those they actually use – are unlike words, in that they are emotionally expressive, intrinsically meaningful and reliable because they are relatively costly and hard to fake.

Speech consists of digital contrasts whose cost is essentially zero. As pure social conventions, signals of this kind cannot evolve in a Darwinian social world – they are a theoretical impossibility. Being intrinsically unreliable, language works only if you can build up a reputation for trustworthiness within a certain kind of society – namely, one where symbolic cultural facts (sometimes called "institutional facts") can be established and maintained through collective social endorsement. In any hunter-gatherer society, the basic mechanism for establishing trust in symbolic cultural facts is collective ritual. Therefore, the task facing researchers into the origins of language is more multidisciplinary than is usually supposed. It involves addressing the evolutionary emergence of human symbolic culture as a whole, with language an important but subsidiary component.

Criticism
Critics of the theory include Noam Chomsky, who terms it the "non-existence" hypothesis – a denial of the very existence of language as an object of study for natural science. Chomsky's own theory is that language emerged in an instant and in perfect form, prompting his critics in turn to retort that only something that doesn't exist – a theoretical construct or convenient scientific fiction – could possibly emerge in such a miraculous way. The controversy remains unresolved.

Twentieth century speculations

Festal origins
The essay "The festal origin of human speech", though published in the late nineteenth century, made little impact until the American philosopher Susanne Langer re-discovered and publicised it in 1941. 
The theory sets out from the observation that primate vocal sounds are above all emotionally expressive. The emotions aroused are socially contagious. Because of this, an extended bout of screams, hoots or barks will tend to express not just the feelings of this or that individual but the mutually contagious ups and downs of everyone within earshot.

Turning to the ancestors of Homo sapiens, the "festal origin" theory suggests that in the "play-excitement" preceding or following a communal hunt or other group activity, everyone might have combined their voices in a comparable way, emphasizing their mood of togetherness with such noises as rhythmic drumming and hand-clapping. Variably pitched voices would have formed conventional patterns, such that choral singing became an integral part of communal celebration.

Although this was not yet speech, according to Langer, it developed the vocal capacities from which speech would later derive. There would be conventional modes of ululating, clapping or dancing appropriate to different festive occasions, each so intimately associated with that kind of occasion that it would tend to collectively uphold and embody the concept of it. Anyone hearing a snatch of sound from such a song would recall the associated occasion and mood. A melodic, rhythmic sequence of syllables conventionally associated with a certain type of celebration would become, in effect, its vocal mark. On that basis, certain familiar sound sequences would become "symbolic".

In support of all this, Langer cites ethnographic reports of tribal songs consisting entirely of "rhythmic nonsense syllables". She concedes that an English equivalent such as "hey-nonny-nonny", although perhaps suggestive of certain feelings or ideas, is neither noun, verb, adjective, nor any other syntactical part of speech. So long as articulate sound served only in the capacity of "hey nonny-nonny", "hallelujah" or "alack-a-day", it cannot yet have been speech. For that to arise, according to Langer, it was necessary for such sequences to be emitted increasingly out of context – outside the total situation that gave rise to them. Extending a set of associations from one cognitive context to another, completely different one, is the secret of metaphor. Langer invokes an early version of what is nowadays termed "grammaticalization" theory to show how, from, such a point of departure, syntactically complex speech might progressively have arisen.

Langer acknowledges Emile Durkheim as having proposed a strikingly similar theory back in 1912. For recent thinking along broadly similar lines, see Steven Brown on "musilanguage", Chris Knight on "ritual" and "play", Jerome Lewis on "mimicry", Steven Mithen on "Hmmmmm" Bruce Richman on "nonsense syllables" and Alison Wray on "holistic protolanguage".

Mirror neuron hypothesis (MSH) and the Motor Theory of Speech Perception

The mirror neuron hypothesis, based on a phenomenon discovered in 2008 by Rizzolatti and Fabbri, supports the motor theory of speech perception. The motor theory of speech perception was proposed in 1967 by Liberman, who believed that the motor system and language systems were closely interlinked. This would result in a more streamlined process of generating speech; both the cognition and speech formulation could occur simultaneously. Essentially, it is wasteful to have a speech decoding and speech encoding process independent of each other. This hypothesis was further supported by the discovery of motor neurons. Rizzolatti and Fabbri found that there were specific neurons in the motor cortex of macaque monkeys which were activated when seeing an action. The neurons which are activated are the same neurons in which would be required to perform the same action themselves. Mirror neurons fire when observing an action and performing an action, indicating that these neurons found in the motor cortex are necessary for understanding a visual process. The presence of mirror neurons may indicate that non-verbal, gestural communication is far more ancient than previously thought to be. Motor theory of speech perception relies on the understanding of motor representations that underlie speech gestures, such as lip movement. There is no clear understanding of speech perception currently, but it is generally accepted that the motor cortex is activated in speech perception to some capacity.

"Musilanguage"
The term "musilanguage" (or "hmmmmm") refers to a pre-linguistic system of vocal communication from which (according to some scholars) both music and language later derived. The idea is that rhythmic, melodic, emotionally expressive vocal ritual helped bond coalitions and, over time, set up selection pressures for enhanced volitional control over the speech articulators. Patterns of synchronized choral chanting are imagined to have varied according to the occasion. For example, "we're setting off to find honey" might sound qualitatively different from "we're setting off to hunt" or "we're grieving over our relative's death". If social standing depended on maintaining a regular beat and harmonizing one's own voice with that of everyone else, group members would have come under pressure to demonstrate their choral skills.

Archaeologist Steven Mithen speculates that the Neanderthals possessed some such system, expressing themselves in a "language" known as "Hmmmmm", standing for Holistic, manipulative, multi-modal, musical and mimetic.p. 169-175 In Bruce Richman's earlier version of essentially the same idea, frequent repetition of the same few songs by many voices made it easy for people to remember those sequences as whole units. Activities that a group of people were doing whilst they were vocalizing together – activities that were important or striking or richly emotional – came to be associated with particular sound sequences, so that each time a fragment was heard, it evoked highly specific memories. The idea is that the earliest lexical items (words) started out as abbreviated fragments of what were originally communal songs.

As group members accumulated an expanding repertoire of songs for different occasions, interpersonal call-and-response patterns evolved along one trajectory to assume linguistic form. Meanwhile, along a divergent trajectory, polyphonic singing and other kinds of music became increasingly specialised and sophisticated.

To explain the establishment of syntactical speech, Richman cites English "I wanna go home". He imagines this to have been learned in the first instance not as a combinatorial sequence of free-standing words, but as a single stuck-together combination – the melodic sound people make to express "feeling homesick". Someone might sing "I wanna go home", prompting other voices to chime in with "I need to go home", "I'd love to go home", "Let's go home" and so forth. Note that one part of the song remains constant, whilst another is permitted to vary. If this theory is accepted, syntactically complex speech began evolving as each chanted mantra allowed for variation at a certain point, allowing for the insertion of an element from some other song. For example, whilst mourning during a funeral rite, someone might want to recall a memory of collecting honey with the deceased, signaling this at an appropriate moment with a fragment of the "we're collecting honey" song.  Imagine that such practices became common. Meaning-laden utterances would now have become subject to a distinctively linguistic creative principle – that of recursive embedding.

Hunter-gatherer egalitarianism

Many scholars associate the evolutionary emergence of speech with profound social, sexual, political and cultural developments. One view is that primate-style dominance needed to give way to a more cooperative and egalitarian lifestyle of the kind characteristic of modern hunter-gatherers.

Intersubjectivity
According to Michael Tomasello, the key cognitive capacity distinguishing Homo sapiens from our ape cousins is "intersubjectivity". This entails turn-taking and role-reversal: your partner strives to read your mind, you simultaneously strive to read theirs, and each of you makes a conscious effort to assist the other in the process. The outcome is that each partner forms a representation of the other's mind in which their own can be discerned by reflection.

Tomasello argues that this kind of bi-directional cognition is central to the very possibility of linguistic communication. Drawing on his research with both children and chimpanzees, he reports that human infants, from one year old onwards, begin viewing their own mind as if from the standpoint of others. He describes this as a cognitive revolution. Chimpanzees, as they grow up, never undergo such a revolution. The explanation, according to Tomasello, is that their evolved psychology is adapted to a deeply competitive way of life. Wild-living chimpanzees from despotic social hierarchies, most interactions involving calculations of dominance and submission. An adult chimp will strive to outwit its rivals by guessing at their intentions whilst blocking them from reciprocating. Since bi-directional intersubjective communication is impossible under such conditions, the cognitive capacities necessary for language don't evolve.

Counter-dominance
In the scenario favoured by David Erdal and Andrew Whiten, primate-style dominance provoked equal and opposite coalitionary resistance – counter-dominance. During the course of human evolution, increasingly effective strategies of rebellion against dominant individuals led to a compromise. Whilst abandoning any attempt to dominate others, group members vigorously asserted their personal autonomy, maintaining their alliances to make potentially dominant individuals think twice. Within increasingly stable coalitions, according to this perspective, status began to be earned in novel ways, social rewards accruing to those perceived by their peers as especially cooperative and self-aware.

Reverse dominance
Whilst counter-dominance, according to this evolutionary narrative, culminates in a stalemate, anthropologist Christopher Boehm extends the logic a step further. Counter-dominance tips over at last into full-scale "reverse dominance". The rebellious coalition decisively overthrows the figure of the primate alpha-male. No dominance is allowed except that of the self-organised community as a whole.

As a result of this social and political change, hunter-gatherer egalitarianism is established. As children grow up, they are motivated by those around them to reverse perspective, engaging with other minds on the model of their own. Selection pressures favor such psychological innovations as imaginative empathy, joint attention, moral judgment, project-oriented collaboration and the ability to evaluate one's own behaviour from the standpoint of others. Underpinning enhanced probabilities of cultural transmission and cumulative cultural evolution, these developments culminated in the establishment of hunter-gatherer-style egalitarianism in association with intersubjective communication and cognition. It is in this social and political context that language evolves.

Scenarios involving mother-infant interactions

"Putting the baby down"
According to Dean Falk's "putting the baby down" theory, vocal interactions between early hominin mothers and infants sparked a sequence of events that led, eventually, to our ancestors' earliest words. The basic idea is that evolving human mothers, unlike their monkey and ape counterparts, couldn't move around and forage with their infants clinging onto their backs. Loss of fur in the human case left infants with no means of clinging on. Frequently, therefore, mothers had to put their babies down. As a result, these babies needed reassurance that they were not being abandoned. Mothers responded by developing "motherese" – an infant-directed communicative system embracing facial expressions, body language, touching, patting, caressing, laughter, tickling and emotionally expressive contact calls. The argument is that language somehow developed out of all this.

Criticism
Whilst this theory may explain a certain kind of infant-directed "protolanguage" – known today as "motherese" – it does little to solve the really difficult problem, which is the emergence amongst adults of syntactical speech.

Co-operative breeding
Evolutionary anthropologist Sarah Hrdy observes that only human mothers amongst great apes are willing to let another individual take hold of their own babies; further, we are routinely willing to let others babysit. She identifies lack of trust as the major factor preventing chimpanzee, bonobo or gorilla mothers from doing the same: "If ape mothers insist on carrying their babies everywhere ... it is because the available alternatives are not safe enough". The fundamental problem is that ape mothers (unlike monkey mothers who may often babysit) do not have female relatives nearby. The strong implication is that, in the course of Homo evolution, allocare could develop because Homo mothers did have female kin close by – in the first place, most reliably, their own mothers. Extending the Grandmother hypothesis, Hrdy argues that evolving Homo erectus females necessarily relied on female kin initially; this novel situation in ape evolution of mother, infant and mother's mother as allocarer provided the evolutionary ground for the emergence of intersubjectivity. She relates this onset of "cooperative breeding in an ape" to shifts in life history and slower child development, linked to the change in brain and body size from the 2 million year mark.

Primatologist Klaus Zuberbühler uses these ideas to help explain the emergence of vocal flexibility in the human species. Co-operative breeding would have compelled infants to struggle actively to gain the attention of caregivers, not all of whom would have been directly related. A basic primate repertoire of vocal signals may have been insufficient for this social challenge. Natural selection, according to this view, would have favoured babies with advanced vocal skills, beginning with babbling (which triggers positive responses in care-givers) and paving the way for the elaborate and unique speech abilities of modern humans.

Was "mama" the first word?
These ideas might be linked to those of the renowned structural linguist Roman Jakobson, who claimed that "the sucking activities of the child are accompanied by a slight nasal murmur, the only phonation to be produced when the lips are pressed to the mother's breast ... and the mouth is full". He proposed that later in the infant's development, "this phonatory reaction to nursing is reproduced as an anticipatory signal at the mere sight of food and finally as a manifestation of a desire to eat, or more generally, as an expression of discontent and impatient longing for missing food or absent nurser, and any ungranted wish". So, the action of opening and shutting the mouth, combined with the production of a nasal sound when the lips are closed, yielded the sound sequence "Mama", which may, therefore, count as the very first word. Peter MacNeilage sympathetically discusses this theory in his major book, The Origin of Speech, linking it with Dean Falk's "putting the baby down" theory (see above). Needless to say, other scholars have suggested completely different candidates for Homo sapiens very first word.

Niche construction theory
Whilst the biological language faculty is genetically inherited, actual languages or dialects are culturally transmitted, as are social norms, technological traditions and so forth. Biologists expect a robust co-evolutionary trajectory linking human genetic evolution with the evolution of culture. Individuals capable of rudimentary forms of protolanguage would have enjoyed enhanced access to cultural understandings, whilst these, conveyed in ways that young brains could readily learn, would, in turn, have become transmitted with increasing efficiency.

In some ways like beavers, as they construct their dams, humans have always engaged in niche construction, creating novel environments to which they subsequently become adapted. Selection pressures associated with prior niches tend to become relaxed as humans depend increasingly on novel environments created continuously by their own productive activities.Odling-Smee, J. and K. N. Laland, 2009. Cultural niche-construction: evolution's cradle of language. In R. Botha and C. Knight (eds.), The Prehistory of Language. Oxford: Oxford University Press, pp. 99-121. According to Steven Pinker, language is an adaptation to "the cognitive niche". Variations on the theme of ritual/speech co-evolution – according to which speech evolved for purposes of internal communication within a ritually constructed domain – have attempted to specify more precisely when, why and how this special niche was created by human collaborative activity.

Conceptual frameworks

Structuralism
 The Swiss scholar Ferdinand de Saussure founded linguistics as a twentieth-century professional discipline. Saussure regarded a language as a rule-governed system, much like a board game such as chess. In order to understand chess, he insisted, we must ignore such external factors as the weather prevailing during a particular session or the material composition of this or that piece. The game is autonomous with respect to its material embodiments. In the same way, when studying language, it's essential to focus on its internal structure as a social institution. External matters (e.g., the shape of the human tongue) are irrelevant from this standpoint. Saussure regarded 'speaking' (parole) as individual, ancillary and more or less accidental by comparison with "language" (langue), which he viewed as collective, systematic and essential.

Saussure showed little interest in Darwin's theory of evolution by natural selection. Nor did he consider it worthwhile to speculate about how language might originally have evolved. Saussure's assumptions in fact cast doubt on the validity of narrowly conceived origins scenarios. His structuralist paradigm, when accepted in its original form, turns scholarly attention to a wider problem: how our species acquired the capacity to establish social institutions in general.

Behaviourism

 In the United States, prior to and immediately following World War II, the dominant psychological paradigm was behaviourism. Within this conceptual framework, language was seen as a certain kind of behaviour – namely, verbal behaviour, to be studied much like any other kind of behaviour in the animal world. Rather as a laboratory rat learns how to find its way through an artificial maze, so a human child learns the verbal behaviour of the society into which it is born. The phonological, grammatical and other complexities of speech are in this sense "external" phenomena, inscribed into an initially unstructured brain. Language's emergence in Homo sapiens, from this perspective, presents no special theoretical challenge. Human behaviour, whether verbal or otherwise, illustrates the malleable nature of the mammalian – and especially the human – brain.

Chomskyan Nativism

Nativism is the theory that humans are born with certain specialised cognitive modules enabling us to acquire highly complex bodies of knowledge such as the grammar of a language.

From the mid-1950s onwards, Noam Chomsky,Chomsky, N. 1966. Cartesian Linguistics. A chapter in the history of rationalist thought. New York: Harper and Row. Jerry Fodor and others mounted what they conceptualised as a 'revolution' against behaviourism. Retrospectively, this became labelled 'the cognitive revolution'.Johnson, D. M. and C. E. Erneling (eds.), 1997. The Future of the Cognitive Revolution. Oxford: Oxford University Press. Whereas behaviourism had denied the scientific validity of the concept of "mind", Chomsky replied that, in fact, the concept of "body" is more problematic. Behaviourists tended to view the child's brain as a tabula rasa, initially lacking structure or cognitive content. According to B. F. Skinner, for example, richness of behavioural detail (whether verbal or non-verbal) emanated from the environment. Chomsky turned this idea on its head. The linguistic environment encountered by a young child, according to Chomsky's version of psychological nativism, is in fact hopelessly inadequate. No child could possibly acquire the complexities of grammar from such an impoverished source. Far from viewing language as wholly external, Chomsky re-conceptualised it as wholly internal. To explain how a child so rapidly and effortlessly acquires its natal language, he insisted, we must conclude that it comes into the world with the essentials of grammar already pre-installed. No other species, according to Chomsky, is genetically equipped with a language faculty – or indeed with anything remotely like one. The emergence of such a faculty in Homo sapiens, from this standpoint, presents biological science with a major theoretical challenge.

Speech act theory
One way to explain biological complexity is by reference to its inferred function. According to the influential philosopher John Austin, speech's primary function is active in the social world.

Speech acts, according to this body of theory, can be analyzed on three different levels: elocutionary, illocutionary and perlocutionary. An act is locutionary when viewed as the production of certain linguistic sounds – for example, practicing correct pronunciation in a foreign language. An act is illocutionary insofar as it constitutes an intervention in the world as jointly perceived or understood. Promising, marrying, divorcing, declaring, stating, authorizing, announcing and so forth are all speech acts in this illocutionary sense. An act is perlocutionary when viewed in terms of its direct psychological effect on an audience. Frightening a baby by saying 'Boo!' would be an example of a "perlocutionary" act.

For Austin, "doing things" with words means, first and foremost, deploying illocutionary force. The secret of this is community participation or collusion. There must be a 'correct' (conventionally agreed) procedure, and all those concerned must accept that it has been properly followed.  In the case of a priest declaring a couple to be man and wife, his words will have illocutionary force only if he is properly authorised and only if the ceremony is properly conducted, using words deemed appropriate to the occasion. Austin points out that should anyone attempt to baptise a penguin, the act would be null and void. For reasons which have nothing to do with physics, chemistry or biology, baptism is inappropriate to be applied to penguins, irrespective of the verbal formulation used.

This body of theory may have implications for speculative scenarios concerning the origins of speech. "Doing things with words" presupposes shared understandings and agreements pertaining not just to language but to social conduct more generally. Apes might produce sequences of structured sound, influencing one another in that way. To deploy illocutionary force, however, they would need to have entered a non-physical and non-biological realm – one of shared contractual and other intangibles. This novel cognitive domain consists of what philosophers term "institutional facts" – objective facts whose existence, paradoxically, depends on communal faith or belief. Few primatologists, evolutionary psychologists or anthropologists consider that nonhuman primates are capable of the necessary levels of joint attention, sustained commitment or collaboration in pursuit of future goals.

Biosemiotics

Biosemiotics is a relatively new discipline, inspired in large part by the discovery of the genetic code in the early 1960s. Its basic assumption is that Homo sapiens is not alone in its reliance on codes and signs. Language and symbolic culture must have biological roots, hence semiotic principles must apply also in the animal world.

The discovery of the molecular structure of DNA apparently contradicted the idea that life could be explained, ultimately, in terms of the fundamental laws of physics. The letters of the genetic alphabet seemed to have "meaning", yet meaning is not a concept that has any place in physics. The natural science community initially solved this difficulty by invoking the concept of "information", treating information as independent of meaning. But a different solution to the puzzle was to recall that the laws of physics in themselves are never sufficient to explain natural phenomena. To explain, say, the unique physical and chemical characteristics of the planets in our solar system, scientists must work out how the laws of physics became constrained by particular sequences of events following the formation of the Sun.

According to Howard Pattee, the same principle applies to the evolution of life on earth, a process in which certain "frozen accidents" or "natural constraints" have from time to time drastically reduced the number of possible evolutionary outcomes. Codes, when they prove to be stable over evolutionary time, are constraints of this kind. The most fundamental such "frozen accident" was the emergence of DNA as a self-replicating molecule, but the history of life on earth has been characterised by a succession of comparably dramatic events, each of which can be conceptualised as the emergence of a new code. From this perspective, the evolutionary emergence of spoken language was one more event of essentially the same kind.

The handicap principle

In 1975, the Israeli theoretical biologist Amotz Zahavi proposed a novel theory which, although controversial, has come to dominate Darwinian thinking on how signals evolve. Zahavi's "handicap principle" states that to be effective, signals must be reliable; to be reliable, the bodily investment in them must be so high as to make cheating unprofitable.

Paradoxically, if this logic is accepted, signals in nature evolve not to be efficient but, on the contrary, to be elaborate and wasteful of time and energy. A peacock's tail is the classic illustration. Zahavi's theory is that since peahens are on the look-out for male braggarts and cheats, they insist on a display of quality so costly that only a genuinely fit peacock could afford to pay. Needless to say, not all signals in the animal world are quite as elaborate as a peacock's tail. But if Zahavi is correct, all require some bodily investment – an expenditure of time and energy which "handicaps" the signaller in some way.

Animal vocalizations (according to Zahavi) are reliable because they are faithful reflections of the state of the signaller's body. To switch from an honest to a deceitful call, the animal would have to adopt a different bodily posture. Since every bodily action has its own optimal starting position, changing that position to produce a false message would interfere with the task of carrying out the action really intended. The gains made by cheating would not make up for the losses incurred by assuming an improper posture – and so the phony message turns out to be not worth its price.p. 69 This may explain, in particular, why ape and monkey vocal signals have evolved to be so strikingly inflexible when compared with the varied speech sounds produced by the human tongue. The apparent inflexibility of chimpanzee vocalizations may strike the human observer as surprising until we realize that being inflexible is necessarily bound up with being perceptibly honest in the sense of "hard-to-fake".

If we accept this theory, the emergence of speech becomes theoretically impossible. Communication of this kind just cannot evolve. The problem is that words are cheap. Nothing about their acoustic features can reassure listeners that they are genuine and not fakes. Any strategy of reliance on someone else's tongue – perhaps the most flexible organ in the body – presupposes unprecedented levels of honesty and trust. To date, Darwinian thinkers have found it difficult to explain the requisite levels of community-wide cooperation and trust.

An influential standard textbook is Animal Signals, by John Maynard Smith and David Harper. These authors divide the costs of communication into two components, (1) the investment necessary to ensure transmission of a discernible signal; (2) the investment necessary to guarantee that each signal is reliable and not a fake. The authors point out that although costs in the second category may be relatively low, they are not zero. Even in relatively relaxed, cooperative social contexts – for example, when communication is occurring between genetic kin – some investment must be made to guarantee reliability. In short, the notion of super-efficient communication – eliminating all costs except those necessary for successful transmission – is biologically unrealistic. Yet speech comes precisely into this category.

The graph shows the different signal intensities as a result of costs and benefits. If two individuals face different costs but have the same benefits, or have different benefits but the same cost, they will signal at different levels. The higher signal represents a more reliable quality. The high-quality individual will maximise costs relative to benefits at a high signal intensities, whilst the low-quality individual maximises their benefits relative to cost at low signal intensity. The high-quality individual is shown to take more risks (greater cost), which can be understood in terms of honest signals, which are expensive. The stronger you are, the more easily you can bear the cost of the signal, making you a more appealing mating partner. The low-quality individuals are less likely to be able to afford a specific signal, and will consequently be less likely to attract a female.

Cognitive linguistics
Cognitive linguistics views linguistic structure as arising continuously out of usage. Speakers are forever discovering new ways to convey meanings by producing sounds, and in some cases, these novel strategies become conventionalised. Between the phonological structure and semantic structure, there is no causal relationship. Instead, each novel pairing of sound and meaning involves an imaginative leap.

In their book, Metaphors We Live By, George Lakoff and Mark Johnson helped pioneer this approach, claiming that metaphor is what makes human thought special. All language, they argued, is permeated with metaphor, whose use in fact constitutes distinctively human – that is, distinctively abstract – thought. To conceptualise things which cannot be directly perceived – intangibles such as time, life, reason, mind, society or justice – we have no choice but to set out from more concrete and directly perceptible phenomena such as motion, location, distance, size and so forth. In all cultures across the world, according to Lakoff and Johnson, people resort to such familiar metaphors as ideas are locations, thinking is moving and mind is body. For example, we might express the idea of "arriving at a crucial point in our argument" by proceeding as if literally traveling from one physical location to the next.

Metaphors, by definition, are not literally true. Strictly speaking, they are fictions – from a pedantic standpoint, even falsehoods. But if we couldn't resort to metaphorical fictions, it's doubtful whether we could even form conceptual representations of such nebulous phenomena as "ideas", thoughts", "minds", and so forth.

The bearing of these ideas on current thinking on speech origins remains unclear. One suggestion is that ape communication tends to resist the metaphor for social reasons. Since they inhabit a Darwinian (as opposed to morally regulated) social world, these animals are under strong competitive pressure not to accept patent fictions as valid communicative currency. Ape vocal communication tends to be inflexible, marginalizing the ultra-flexible tongue, precisely because listeners treat with suspicion any signal which might prove to be a fake. Such insistence on perceptible veracity is clearly incompatible with metaphoric usage. An implication is that neither articulate speech nor distinctively human abstract thought could have begun evolving until our ancestors had become more cooperative and trusting of one another's communicative intentions.

Natural science vs social science interpretations

Social reality
When people converse with one another, according to the American philosopher John Searle, they're making moves, not in the real world which other species inhabit, but in a shared virtual realm peculiar to ourselves. Unlike the deployment of muscular effort to move a physical object, the deployment of illocutionary force requires no physical effort (except the movement of the tongue/mouth to produce speech) and produces no effect which any measuring device could detect. Instead, our action takes place on a quite different level – that of social reality. This kind of reality is in one sense hallucinatory, being a product of collective intentionality. It consists, not of "brute facts" – facts which exist anyway, irrespective of anyone's belief – but of "institutional facts", which "exist" only if you believe in them. Government, marriage, citizenship and money are examples of "institutional facts". One can distinguish between "brute" facts and "institutional" ones by applying a simple test. Suppose no one believed in the fact – would it still be true? If the answer is "yes", it's "brute". If the answer is "no", it's "institutional".

The facts of language in general and of speech, in particular, are, from this perspective, "institutional" rather than "brute". The semantic meaning of a word, for example, is whatever its users imagine it to be. To "do things with words" is to operate in a virtual world which seems real because we share it in common. In this incorporeal world, the laws of physics, chemistry, and biology do not apply. That explains why illocutionary force can be deployed without exerting muscular effort. Apes and monkeys inhabit the "brute" world. To make an impact, they must scream, bark, threaten, seduce or in other ways invest bodily effort. If they were invited to play chess, they would be unable to resist throwing their pieces at one another. Speech is not like that. A few movements of the tongue, under appropriate conditions, can be sufficient to open parliament, annul a marriage, confer a knighthood or declare war. To explain, on a Darwinian basis, how such apparent magic first began to work, we must ask how, when and why Homo sapiens succeeded in establishing the wider domain of institutional facts.

Nature or society?

"Brute facts", in the terminology of speech act philosopher John Searle, are facts which are true anyway, regardless of human belief. For example, a person might not believe in gravity; however, if the person jumped over a cliff, they would still fall. Natural science is the study of facts of this kind. "Institutional facts" are fictions accorded factual status within human social institutions. Monetary and commercial facts are fictions of this kind. The complexities of today's global currency system are facts only whilst society believes in them: suspend the belief and the facts correspondingly dissolve. Yet although institutional facts rest on human belief, that doesn't make them mere distortions or hallucinations. Take a person's confidence that two five-pound banknotes are worth ten pounds. That is not merely a subjective belief: it's an objective, indisputable fact. But now imagine a collapse of public confidence in the currency system. Suddenly, the realities in a person's pocket dissolve.

Scholars who doubt the scientific validity of the notion of "institutional facts" include Noam Chomsky, for whom language is not social. In Chomsky's view, language is a natural object (a component of the individual brain) and its study, therefore, a branch of natural science. In explaining the origin of language, scholars in this intellectual camp invoke non-social developments – in Chomsky's case, a random genetic mutation. Chomsky argues that language might exist inside the brain of a single mutant gorilla even if no one else believed in it, even if no one else existed apart from the mutant – and even if the gorilla in question remained unaware of its existence, never actually speaking. In the opposite philosophical camp are those who, in the tradition of Ferdinand de Saussure, argue that if no one believed in words or rules, they simply would not exist. These scholars, correspondingly, regard language as essentially institutional, concluding that linguistics should be considered a topic within social science. In explaining the evolutionary emergence of language, scholars in this intellectual camp tend to invoke profound changes in social relationships.Criticism.''' Darwinian scientists today see little value in the traditional distinction between "natural" and "social" science. Darwinism in its modern form is the study of cooperation and competition in nature – a topic which is intrinsically social. Against this background, there is an increasing awareness amongst evolutionary linguists and Darwinian anthropologists that traditional inter-disciplinary barriers can have damaging consequences for investigations into the origins of speech.

See also

 Animal communication
 Biolinguistics
 Deception in animals
 Evolutionary anthropology
 Essay on the Origin of Languages
 Historical linguistics
 Human evolution
 Language acquisition
 Linguistic anthropology
 Linguistic universals
 Neurobiological origins of language
 Origins of society
 Origin of language
 Physical anthropology
 Proto-language
 Proto-Human language
 Recent African origin of modern humans
 Signalling theory
 Sociocultural evolution
 Symbolic culture
 Universal grammar

 Notes 

 Further reading 

 Bickerton, D. 2009. Adam's Tongue. New York: Hill and Wang.
 Botha, R. and C. Knight (eds) 2009. The Prehistory of Language. Oxford: Oxford University Press.
 Botha, R. and C. Knight (eds) 2009. The Cradle of Language. Oxford: Oxford University Press.
 Burling, R. 2005. The Talking Ape. How language evolved. Oxford: Oxford University Press.
 Christiansen, M. and S. Kirby (eds), 2003. Language Evolution. Oxford: Oxford University Press.
 Corballis, M. C., 2002. From Hand to Mouth: The Origins of Language. Princeton and Oxford: Princeton University Press.
 Deacon, T. W., 1997. The Symbolic Species: The Co-evolution of Language and the Brain. New York: W.W. Norton.
 de Boer. 2001. "The Origins of Vowels Systems", Oxford University Press.
 de Grolier, E. (ed.), 1983. The Origin and Evolution of Language. Paris: Harwood Academic Publishers.
 Deutscher, G. 2005. The Unfolding of Language. The evolution of mankind's greatest invention. London: Random House.
 Dor, D., C. Knight and J. Lewis (eds), 2014. The Social Origins of Language. Oxford: Oxford University Press.
 Dunbar, R. I. M. 1996. Grooming, Gossip and the Evolution of Language. London: Faber and Faber.
 
 Fitch, W. T. 2010. The Evolution of Language. Cambridge: Cambridge University Press.
 Harnad, S. R., H. D. Steklis and J. Lancaster (eds), 1976. Origins and Evolution of Language and Speech. New York: Annals of the New York Academy of Sciences.
 Hrdy,  S. B. 2009. Mothers and others. The evolutionary origins of mutual understanding. London and Cambridge, Massachusetts: Belknap Press of Harvard University Press.
 Hurford, J. R. 2007. The Origins of Meaning. Language in the light of evolution. Oxford: Oxford University Press.
 
 Kenneally, C. 2007. The First Word. The search for the origins of language. New York: Viking.
 Lenneberg, E. H. 1967. Biological Foundations of Language. New York: Wiley.
 Leroi-Gourhan, A. 1993. Gesture and Speech. Trans. A. Bostock Berger. Cambridge, Massachusetts: MIT Press.
 
 
 Logan, Robert K. 2007. "The Extended Mind: The Emergence of Language, the Human Mind and Culture. Toronto: University of Toronto Press.
 MacNeilage, P. 2008. The Origin of Speech. Oxford: Oxford University Press.
 Maynard Smith, J. and D. Harper 2003. Animal Signals. Oxford: Oxford University Press.
 Oudeyer, P-Y. (2006) "Self-Organization in the Evolution of Speech", Oxford University Press.
 Tallerman, M. and K. Gibson (eds), 2012. The Oxford Handbook of Language Evolution. Oxford: Oxford University Press.
 Tomasello, M. 2008. Origins of Human Communication. Cambridge, Massachusetts: MIT Press.
 Zahavi, A. and A. Zahavi 1997. The Handicap Principle. A missing piece in Darwin's puzzle.'' New York and Oxford: Oxford University Press.

External links
 Interactive sagittal section
 Design features of speech 
 Evolution of speech (anatomical and neural bases). 
 Ritual and the origins of language.
 Decoding Chomsky

Language